Lex (1999 – March 25, 2012) was the first active duty, fully fit military working dog to be granted early retirement in order to be adopted. Working for his United States Marine Corps handler Corporal Dustin J. Lee in the Iraq War, he was wounded in an attack that killed Lee, and subsequently was awarded an honorary Purple Heart.

Military working dog
Lee and Lex were stationed in the military police department at Marine Corps Logistics Base Albany, with Lex having deployed to Iraq previously with a different handler.  Lee had adopted his previous canine, Doenja, after the dog was retired. They were detached to deploy in late November 2006 as an explosive detection and patrol team for 3rd Reconnaissance Battalion, then part of Regimental Combat Team 6. On March 21, 2007, while at a Forward Operating Base in Iraq, they were hit by a 73 mm SPG-9 rocket attack. Lee was mortally wounded, while Lex sustained shrapnel wounds. Despite his own wounds, Lex refused to leave Lee and had to be dragged away for corpsmen and other medics to attempt treatment. After returning to the United States in April, he fully recovered from his wounds at Marine Corps Base Camp Lejeune after a twelve-week rehabilitation. He returned to MCLB Albany on July 6 in a full working capacity, although some shrapnel remained lodged in his back, which veterinarians did not remove to avoid causing permanent damage to his spine.

Adoption

Lee’s parents, Jerome and Rachel Lee, appealed to the military to adopt Lex. An online petition was created by Lee's family, and the case gained national media attention. Congressman Walter B. Jones of North Carolina's 3rd congressional district (which includes Camp Lejeune) assisted the Lee family with the release and adoption of Lex. Although the United States armed forces do not generally release military working dogs prior to retirement age due to certain requirements (due to ), there existed a provision to existing law that allows for early retirement of dogs under certain situations, created to allow a wounded Air Force dog handler to adopt her partner before retirement in 2005. The legal provision was enacted and Lex was released from active service to be adopted by the Lee family.

Headquarters Marine Corps made a formal request to the Air Force working dog program managers at Lackland Air Force Base in November, which was approved on December 6. Lex was released from five years of active service and turned over to the Lee family at a ceremony at MCLB Albany on December 21, 2007, under national media spotlight. He was 8 years old at the time. Afterward, Lex began to visit VA hospitals to comfort wounded veterans and assist in their recovery process. On February 16, 2008, the Military Order of the Purple Heart Chapter #566 presented Lex with a commemorative Purple Heart at a ceremony held at the Air Force Armament Museum at Eglin Air Force Base. On September 24, 2008, the American Kennel Club announced that Lex won the seventh Law Enforcement AKC Award for Canine Excellence. On March 19, 2010, MCLB Albany's base dog kennel was named in honor of Lee, with Lex in attendance.

After his adoption, Lex struggled with mobility issues due to his injuries and approximately 50 pieces of shrapnel that remain in his body, despite treatment at Mississippi State University's College of Veterinary Medicine. On November 16, 2010, Lex began treatment at Georgetown Veterinary Hospital with a course of Vet-Stem stem cell regenerative therapy, with assistance from the Humane Society of the United States and Kentucky Congressman Ed Whitfield.

Death

Lex died on March 25, 2012 as a result of cancer.

Gallery

See also

Dogs in warfare
List of individual dogs
Military animal

References
www.sunherald.com/2012/04/20/3895746/slain-marines-service-dog-dies.html

 Video by Mike Phelan: http://www.cnn.com/2007/US/12/21/marine.dog/index.html#cnnSTCVideo

External links
Memorial website for Lee
Lex receives his commemorative Purple Heart
Military Working Dog Memorial**

1999 animal births
2012 animal deaths
Animals of the United States Marine Corps
Detection dogs
German shepherds
Individual dogs in the United States
United States Marine Corps in the Iraq War
Deaths from cancer in Mississippi
Animal deaths from cancer